The National Indigenous Music Awards 2014 are the 11th annual National Indigenous Music Awards.

The nominations were announced on 24 July 2014 and the awards ceremony was held on 10 August 2014.

Performers
Dan Sultan  
Catherine Satour
Tom E. Lewis
The Tjintu Desert Band
The Desert Divas, 
The Arnhem Land dancers Djuki Mala (Chooky Dancers).
Hip hop showcase featuring - Briggs, Jimblah, The Last Kinection and Philly

Hall of Fame Inductee 
 Munkimuk

Mark Ross (aka Munkimuk) is a Sydney-based hip-hop performer and music producer. He is known as "The Grandfather of Indigenous Hip Hop" and has been performing since 1984.

Triple J Unearthed National Indigenous Winner
 Philly

Philly was born in 1991. His traditional homeland is in Swan Hill, on banks of the Murray River. Philly said "I feel like I'm obligated to use my music to make change for the better and to use my craft to teach. Through music I have always wanted to voice my opinion; whether it be about Aboriginal issues or to bring positive messages for Aboriginal youth, I understand that I have been given an opportunity to inform." He released his debut single "We On" in 2014.

Awards
Artist of the Year

Best New Talent of the Year

Album of the Year

Film Clip of the Year

Song of the Year

Cover Art of the Year

Traditional Song of the Year

Community Clip of the Year

References

2014 in Australian music
2014 music awards
National Indigenous Music Awards